Military Road is a major east–west collector road and limited-access road in the northwestern quadrant of Washington D.C., United States.

History

Military Road was constructed by the Union Army during the American Civil War, intended to serve as a route connecting military forts in Northwest D.C. It also served as a second crossing over Rock Creek, with a bridge (now Joyce Road Bridge) constructed in 1929, as a bypass of the Milkhouse Road ford that initially served as the only crossing in the area. Around 1960, a four-lane limited-access parkway bypass with a new bridge crossing Rock Creek was built, realigning Military Road from the original two-lane road across the creek.

Route

Military Road begins at the Maryland border in Friendship Heights as a two-lane collector road and heads east through the neighborhood of Chevy Chase where it intersects Connecticut Avenue halfway through the neighborhood. Once crossing Nebraska Avenue, Military Road widens to four lanes. Eventually, the road curves northeast, passes St. John's College High School, and crosses Oregon Avenue then becomes a  limited-access road through Rock Creek Park. Through the park, Military Road has a partial trumpet interchange with Joyce Road, crosses the creek, then forms a parclo interchange with 16th Street NW. At the eastern end of the parkway portion, Military Road intersects with 14th Street NW and becomes a general arterial road, and shortly becomes Missouri Avenue, near the Military Road School, which continues east towards U.S. Route 29.

Major intersections

References

Streets in Washington, D.C.